The Old Union Depot Hotel (previously known as the Union Hotel and Cafe) was a historic hotel and commercial building in Tampa, Florida, United States. The building was constructed in 1912 at 858 East Zack Street, directly across Nebraska Avenue from Tampa Union Station.  On December 11, 2000, it was added to the U.S. National Register of Historic Places, however, the building was torn down on May 23, 2010.

Built as one of twelve continuous, two-story, brick storefronts around the intersection of Nebraska Avenue and East Zack Street, on the northeastern edge of downtown Tampa, the building had six sides, an unusual design made necessary by the irregular shape of the lot upon which it was built.  The hotel and its neighboring businesses generally catered to train passengers arriving at Union Station, which like the hotel, first opened in 1912.  Of those dozen commercial buildings, the Union Hotel structure was the last to remain standing.  Its standing as a hotel, however, could not last indefinitely, and after a period of time the Union Hotel and Cafe closed.  The building was boarded up and sat vacant for a period of many years, during which time it failed to attract any new occupants.

On December 11, 2000, the Old Union Depot Hotel building was recognized with a listing in the U.S. National Register of Historic Places (NRHP).  It had been hoped that the historic status and accompanying tax incentives would be catalysts towards restoration and preservation of the building, but unfortunately, this would not be the case.  After a lengthy period of disuse, and nearly a decade after its NRHP designation, the building suffered a collapse of its roof and was deemed to be hazardous.  The city of Tampa condemned the structure and ordered its demolition, which took place on May 23, 2010.

The Union Hotel and Cafe began its operations during the era of racial segregation, and functioned as an establishment for "whites only".  Train passengers and other travelers who were black were directed about one block west from the hotel along Zack Street to the Jackson House, a rooming house which was one of the only lodging establishments in the city for blacks.  The Jackson Rooming House building, incidentally, was built during the same period as the Union Depot Hotel, and is also NRHP-listed.

See also
 National Register of Historic Places listings in Tampa, Florida
 Jackson Rooming House

References

External links

 Hillsborough County listings at National Register of Historic Places
 Florida's Office of Cultural and Historical Programs
 Hillsborough County listings

Hotel buildings completed in 1912
Hotels in Tampa, Florida
National Register of Historic Places in Tampa, Florida
Demolished hotels in Florida
Railway hotels in the United States
Vernacular architecture in Florida
1912 establishments in Florida
2010 disestablishments in Florida
Buildings and structures demolished in 2010